The 2015 European Junior Badminton Championships were held at the Regional Sport Centrum Hall in Lubin, Poland, between 26 March - 4 April 2015.

Medalists

Medal table

References

European Junior Badminton Championships
European Junior Badminton Championships
European Junior Badminton Championships
European Junior Badminton Championships
International sports competitions hosted by Poland